Petalomonas is a genus of phagotrophic, flagellated euglenoids. Phagotrophic euglenoids are one of the most important forms of flagellates in benthic aquatic systems, playing an important role in microbial food webs. The traits that distinguish this particular genus are highly variable, especially at higher taxa. However, general characteristics such as a rigid cell shape and single emergent flagellum can describe the species among this genus.

History of knowledge
Petalomonas was first described by Dr. Friedrich Stein, a zoologist at the University of Prague, in 1859.

Habitat and ecology
Petalomonas is a cosmopolitan genus, most abundant in fresh water with a few species observed in marine environments. These euglenoids mainly reside in muddy sediments as benthic organisms. The cells are phagotrophic, feeding on bacteria, and/or osmotophic, assimilating nutrients from its surroundings.

Description
These non-metabolic, colourless cells range in size from 8–45 um, with a general flattened, leaf-like shape. The posterior end is rounded or truncate and the anterior end is narrowed; however, cells can span from ovoid, to fusiform or triangular, to elongately oval. A distinguishing feature of the euglenoids is the presence of proteinaceous pellicle strips that are underlined with microtubules. In Petalomonas, cells are covered with approximately a dozen thickly, fused pellicle strips making the cell very rigid and possibly resistant to surface ice crystal formation that can disrupt the cell. These pellicle strips, unlike most euglenoids, are lacking grooves or troughs; however, species specific pellicle features, such as pleat-like thickenings at the joints of pellicle strips, that characterize P. cantuscygni, can distinguish certain species. Strong ribs or keels are also evident in these cells, which can be arranged spirally or relatively straight, ranging in width. Some species may contain furrows that vary in size and depth, and can be located dorsally and/or ventrally on the body of the cell. The cells also have an abundance of paramylon bodies, typically used for the storage of starch, that are observed in all species.

The feeding structure, not visible under light microscopy, is relatively simple consisting of a pocket-like cavity ending with a cytostome, lined with microtubules for phagocytosis.  The cells within this genus are also defined by one emergent flagellum extending from a sub-apical opening, directed anteriorly when swimming.  The movement of this flagellum is very minimal with some vibration at the tip; however, some species are observed to have vigorously, whipping flagellum that result in rapid rotation and oscillation of the cell body.  These euglenoids have also been observed to glide forward using the body, while the flagellum is used to contact the substrate.  The nucleus is located centrally to the left side of the cell.

Life history
In euglenoids, sexual reproduction is unknown; however, asexual reproduction has been observed to occur in this genus through longitudinal fission, where the division occurs very quickly, starting at the anterior end of the cell.

List of species

 Petalomonas abscissa (Dujardin) Stein
 Petalomonas acuminata Hollande
 Petalomonas africana Bourrelly
 Petalomonas alata  (A.C. Stokes) A.C. Stokes
 Petalomonas applanata Skuja
 Petalomonas arcuata Hollande
 Petalomonas asymmetrica Schawhan & Jahn 
 Petalomonas bicarinata Shawhan & Jahn
 Petalomonas calycimonadoides Christen
 Petalomonas calycimonoides W.J.Lee & D.J.Patterson
 Petalomonas cantuscygni J.Cann & N.Pennick
 Petalomonas carinata A.C.Stokes
 Petalomonas christenii W.J.Lee & D.J.Patterson
 Petalomonas conchata Christen
 Petalomonas curvata Skuja
 Petalomonas dentata Christen
 Petalomonas dilatata Hollande
 Petalomonas dorsalis Stokes
 Petalomonas dubosqui Hollande
 Petalomonas excavata Skuja
 Petalomonas gibbera Christen
 Petalomonas gigas Skuja
 Petalomonas hyalina Christen
 Petalomonas inflexa G.A.Klebs
 Petalomonas intorta W.J.Lee & D.J.Patterson
 Petalomonas involuta Skuja
 Petalomonas irregularis Skuja
 Petalomonas iugosa W.J.Lee & D.J.Patterson
 Petalomonas klebsii Christen
 Petalomonas klinostoma Skuja
 Petalomonas labrum W.J.Lee & D.J.Patterson
 Petalomonas lata Christen
 Petalomonas mediocanellata F. Stein
 Petalomonas messikommeri Christen
 Petalomonas micra R.E.Norris
 Petalomonas minor Larson & D.J. Patterson
 Petalomonas minuta Hollande
 Petalomonas minutula Christen
 Petalomonas mira Awerinzew
 Petalomonas ornata Skvortzov
 Petalomonas ovata Skvortzov
 Petalomonas ovum Matvienko
 Petalomonas paludosa Christen
 Petalomonas pentacarinata Péterfi
 Petalomonas phacoides Skuja
 Petalomonas plana W.J.Lee & D.J.Patterson
 Petalomonas platyrhyncha Skuja
 Petalomonas pluteus Christen
 Petalomonas praegnans Skuja
 Petalomonas pringsheimii Christen 
 Petalomonas prototheca Skuja
 Petalomonas punctato-striata Skuja
 Petalomonas pusilla Skuja
 Petalomonas quadrilineata Penard
 Petalomonas quinquecarinata Hollande
 Petalomonas quinquemarginata Shawhan & Jahn
 Petalomonas robusta Christen
 Petalomonas septemcarinata Shawhan & Jahn
 Petalomonas sexlobata Klebs
 Petalomonas simplex Christen
 Petalomonas sinica Skvortzov
 Petalomonas sinuata F.Stein
 Petalomonas sphagnicola Tschermak-Woess
 Petalomonas sphagnophila Christen
 Petalomonas spinifera (Lackey) W.J.Lee & D.J.Patterson
 Petalomonas splendens Hollande
 Petalomonas steinii Klebs
 Petalomonas stellata Skvortzov
 Petalomonas sulcata A.C.Stokes
 Petalomonas tenuis Christen
 Petalomonas triangula Z.X.Shi
 Petalomonas tricarinata Skuja
 Petalomonas triquetra Skvortzov
 Petalomonas variabilis Christen
 Petalomonas ventritracta Skuja
 Petalomonas virgata W.J.Lee & D.J.Patterson
 Petalomonas vulgaris Skuja
 Petalomonas wuhanica Z.Shi

References 

Euglenozoa